Lingual may refer to:
 Tongue, a muscular hydrostat on the floors of the mouths of most vertebrates which manipulates food for mastication
 Lingual, in palaeontology, the side of the teeth that faces the tongue
 Lingual artery arises from the external carotid between the superior thyroid and facial artery
 Lingual veins begin on the dorsum, sides, and under surface of the tongue, and, passing backward along the course of the lingual artery, end in the internal jugular vein
 Lingual gyrus of the occipital lobe lies between the calcarine sulcus and the posterior part of the collateral sulcus
 Lingual bone
 Lingual nerve, a branch of the mandibular nerve
 HTLINGUAL